Volumen is a music video collection released by Icelandic musician Björk on 30 November 1998 as a  VHS and on 31 May 1999 as a DVD. It includes all of Björk's videos until "Hunter". On 2 December 2002, it was reissued as Greatest Hits - Volumen 1993–2003 which includes all the videos to "Nature Is Ancient". A separate DVD released in 2002, Volumen Plus, is available for those who purchased this original release and who want the additional seven videos. It has been certified Gold in the USA.

Track listing

References

Björk video albums